Whiting Peak is an unofficial name for a mountain in British Columbia, Canada.

The name "Whiting Peak" is derived from its being the high point of a group of mountains bordered by two bodies of water. Whiting Lake lies to the east and the Whiting River runs to the west of this group.

See also
 Geography of British Columbia

References

External links
 "Whiting Peak, British Columbia" on Peakbagger

Two-thousanders of British Columbia
Boundary Ranges